Kennon Island (52°56N 173°15E) is a 0.3-mi-long satellite of Attu Island in the Near Islands group at the extreme western end of the Aleutian Islands, Alaska.  It is located 0.5 mi off the east side of Attu in Chichagof Bay.  It was named by Lt. William Gibson in July 1855 for Lt. Beverley Kennon, U.S. Navy.  Lt. Kennon served with Lt. Gibson on the schooner USS Fenimore Cooper during the North Pacific Exploring Expedition of 1854-1855 under the command of captains Caldwalader Ringgold and John Rodgers.

Near Islands
Islands of Alaska
Islands of Unorganized Borough, Alaska